Stenandriopsis is a genus of flowering plants belonging to the family Acanthaceae. It is considered a synonym of Stenandrium by some sources, including Plants of the World Online , Molecular phylogenies have placed the Old
World Stenandriopsis apart from New World Stenandrium, and the genus is accepted in a classification of the family Acanthaceae published in 2022.

Species
When accepted, the genus contains about 20 species.

References

Acanthaceae
Acanthaceae genera